Pir Bazar Rural District is a rural district (dehestan) in the Central District of Rasht County, Gilan Province, Iran. At the 2006 census, its population was 21,374, in 5,845 families. The rural district has 26 villages.

References 

Rural Districts of Gilan Province
Rasht County